Hallstabacken are ski jumping hills in Sollefteå, Sweden.

History
It was built from 1930-1933 and owned by Sollefteå GIF. It was opened on 25 February 1934. It hosted FIS Nordic World Ski Championships 1934 and one FIS Ski jumping World Cup event in 1990 on normal hill. Thomas Morgenstern holds the hill record.

World Cup

Men

Ski jumping venues in Sweden
Sport in Sweden
Sports venues completed in 1934
1934 establishments in Sweden